
Chufut-Kale (Russian and Ukrainian: Чуфут-Кале - Chufut-Kale; Karaim: Кала - קלעה - Kala) is a medieval city-fortress in the Crimean Mountains that now lies in ruins.

Its name is Crimean Tatar and Turkish for "Jewish Fortress" (çufut/çıfıt - Jew, qale/kale - fortress), while Crimean Karaites refer to it simply as "Fortress", considering the place as historical center for the Crimean Karaite community. In the Middle Ages the fortress was known as Qırq Yer (Place of Forty) and as Karaites to which sect the greater part of its inhabitants belong, Sela' ha-Yehudim  (Hebrew for 'Rock of the Jews').

Name versions
 Чуфут-Кале (Russian transliteration: Chufut Kale) is mentioned in the Soviet scientific literature, as well as in the works of Karaite authors in the Russian language from the second half of the 19th century to the post-Soviet epoch, including Seraya Shapshal's publications;
 Juft Qale [Джуфт Кале] is used by modern Crimean Karaite leaders, arguing that this is the original name of the town  (in translation from Turkic - Double fortress), that over time it evolved into "a wrong but more easily pronounced name: Chufut-Kale [Чуфут Кале] or Chuft-Kale [Чуфт Кале]";
  Qırq Yer, Qırq Or, Kyrk-Or, Gevher Kermen Çufut-Qale, Çıfut-Qalesi, Orda-i muazzam Kirkyir were the Crimean Tatar names during the Crimean Khanate;
  Kala (Karaim: , кала, kala - fortress);
 Sela Yuhudim ( - «Rock of the Jews" (in the Karaite pronunciation) was used in Crimean Karaite literature until the second half of 19th century;
 Sela ha-Karaim (Hebrew:  - "Rock of the Karaites ") used by Crimean Karaites  from the second half of 19th century;

History
Researchers are not unanimous as to the time of the town's appearance. The town was probably a fortified settlement in the 5th or 6th century on the periphery of the Byzantine Empire. Others are of the opinion that the fortified settlement appeared in the 10th-11th centuries. During the early period of the town's history, it was mainly populated by Alans, the most powerful of a late Sarmatian tribes of Iranian descent. They began penetrating the Crimea from the 2nd century AD. Settling down in the mountainous Crimea, the Alans adopted Christianity. In written sources the cave town is mentioned in the 13th century under the name of Kyrk-Or (Forty Fortifications). This name lasted until the mid-17th century. In 1299 the Tatar horde of Emir Nogai raided the Crimean peninsula. Kyrk-Or was then garrisoned by Byzantine soldiers. The stout fortress resisted direct storming by the Tatars, who then contrived to weaken the defenders by playing loud music for three days and nights. On the fourth morning, the defenders were too exhausted to repel a fresh attack, and the fortress succumbed to a general massacre. Having thus seized the town, the Tatars quartered their garrison in it. At the turn of the 15th century, Tatars settled Karaite craftsmen in front of the eastern line of fortifications and  built a second defensive wall to protect their settlement, and thus a new part of the town appeared.

After the Fall of Constantinople in 1453, many Greek-speaking Qaraites decided to migrate to the Mangup and Chufut-Kale as the places had a familiar Christian Greek culture.

In the 15th century the first Crimean Khan, Hadji-Girei, realizing the fortress’ advantages, turned the old section of the town into his fortified residence. After the defeat of the Golden Horde, the Crimean Khanate became considerably stronger. The significance of Kyrk-Or as a stronghold declined, and the Crimean Khan, Menglis-Girei, moved his capital to Bakhchisarai. The old town remained a citadel of Bakhchisarai and a place of incarceration for aristocratic prisoners. In the mid-17th century Tatars left Kyrk-Or. Only Karaites and several Krymchak families remained living there due to anti-Jewish restrictions on stays in other towns of the Crimean Khanate. Tatars considered Karaites to be Jews, hence the town gradually acquired the name of Chufut-Kale, which in Turkic meant "Jewish fortress" with negative and scornful meaning.

After the Crimea's conquest and its inclusion into the Russian empire, the fortress inhabitants were permitted to live anywhere in the Crimea. From that time on, Chufut-Kale was deserted. By the mid-19th century the town ceased to exist.

Legends 
There are many legends concerning the place. According to one, it was called "Qırq Yer" because the khans Meñli Giray or Tokhtamysh, the founders of the city, brought with them forty Karaite families, and in their honor called it the "Place of Forty".

Another legend, fostered by the Karaites to show the antiquity of their sect, says that Karaites were brought there from Persia at the time of the first Exile. The early settlers of the city exercised great influence upon their neighbors, the Khazars. The ḥakam Abraham Firkovich, who was very skilful in falsifying epitaphs and manuscripts, pretended to have unearthed at the cemetery of Chufut-Kale tombstones dating from the year 6 of the common era, and to have discovered the tomb of Sangari, which is still shown by the Karaites. According to Harkavy, however, no epitaph earlier than 1203 can be seen at the cemetery of Chufut-Kale, called "Vale of Jehoshaphat"; and the tombs do not belong to Karaites, but to the old Rabbinite settlers called Krymchaks. Chufut-Kale, however, existed as early as the seventh century. Abu al-Fida mentions it under the name  "Qırq Yer".

Gallery

In fiction
"Chufutkale" is mentioned (and also transliterated as "Chew-Foot-Calais") in Vladimir Nabokov's 1968 masterpiece, "Ada", page 338.  The novel uses the site for the death of a minor character, Percy de Prey, during an imaginary Second Crimean War in 1888.

It is also mentioned in Jonathan Littel's great book "The kindly Ones" (2006) page 232 and is used to emphasize the regions intricate history.

Adam Mickiewicz wrote a sonnet Droga nad przepaścią w Czufut-Kale (The Pass Across the Abyss in Czufut-Kale), published in 1826.

See also
Karaite Judaism
Kenesa
The Valley Of Ghosts
Mangup

References

External links

 History and monuments of Chufut Kale(Чуфут-Кале)
 The map of the fortress

Former capitals of Crimea
Defunct towns in Russia
Crimean Karaites
Forts in Russia
Forts in Ukraine
Former populated places in Crimea
Ghost towns in Ukraine
Tourist attractions in Crimea
Bakhchysarai Raion
Cultural heritage monuments of federal significance in Crimea